Sir Thomas Mildmay, 1st Baronet (ca. 1573 – 1626) of Moulsham, Essex, was an English politician.

He was the eldest son of Sir Thomas Mildmay of Moulsham and Lady Frances Radclyffe and was educated at Queens' College, Cambridge (1589) and Corpus Christi College, Cambridge (1590).

He was a Member of Parliament (MP) for Maldon 1593, knighted in 1603 and created a baronet in 1611.

He married twice; firstly Elizabeth, the daughter of Sir John Puckering and secondly Ann, the daughter of Sir John Savile. He had no children and the baronetcy died with him.

References

1570s births
1626 deaths
People from Chelmsford
Alumni of Queens' College, Cambridge
Alumni of Corpus Christi College, Cambridge
English MPs 1593
Baronets in the Baronetage of England
Members of Parliament for Maldon
Thomas, 1st Baronet